15th Brigade or 15th Infantry Brigade may refer to:

Australia
 15th Brigade (Australia)

Brazil
15th Brigade (Brazil)

Greece
 15th Infantry Brigade (Greece)

Hungary 
 15th Infantry Brigade (Hungary)

India
 15th (Imperial Service) Cavalry Brigade

Japan
 15th Brigade (Japan)

Romania
 15th Mechanized Brigade (Romania)

Spain
 XV International Brigade

United Kingdom
 15th Infantry Brigade (United Kingdom)
 15th Mounted Brigade (United Kingdom)
 Artillery Brigades
 15th Brigade Royal Field Artillery
 XV Brigade, Royal Horse Artillery

United States
 15th Sustainment Brigade (United States)

See also
XV Corps (disambiguation)
15th Army (disambiguation)
15th Division (disambiguation)
15th Group (disambiguation)
15th Wing (disambiguation)
15th Regiment (disambiguation)
15 Squadron (disambiguation)